Michael Joseph Nikorak (born September 16, 1996) is an American former professional baseball pitcher. He was drafted by the Colorado Rockies in the first round of the 2015 Major League Baseball draft.

Career
Nikorak attended Stroudsburg High School in Stroudsburg, Pennsylvania. He played baseball and football. In September 2013 he committed to the University of Alabama to play college baseball. As a junior, he went 4–3 with a 1.01 earned run average (ERA) and 66 strikeouts in  innings and also batted .460. Nikorak impressed scouts during numerous showcases during the summer 2014 after he hit 97 miles per hour.

Nikorak was selected by the Colorado Rockies with the 27th selection in the 2015 Major League Baseball draft. He signed with the Rockies, and was assigned to the Grand Junction Rockies, where he posted a 0-4 record with an 11.72 ERA in  innings pitched. Nikorak returned to Grand Junction in 2016, where he improved, going 1-0 with a 3.68 ERA in  innings pitched.

On April 12, 2017, it was revealed that Nikorak would undergo Tommy John surgery, causing him to miss the 2017 season. Due to recovering from surgery as well as other injuries, he pitched a total of  innings combined in 2018 and 2019.

He did not play in a game in 2020 due to the cancellation of the Minor League Baseball season because of the COVID-19 pandemic. On April 26, 2021, Nikorak retired from professional baseball after an injury plagued career.

Personal life
His brother Steve Nikorak played in the Chicago White Sox organization.

References

External links

1996 births
Living people
People from Monroe County, Pennsylvania
Baseball players from Pennsylvania
Baseball pitchers
Grand Junction Rockies players
Boise Hawks players
Asheville Tourists players